Rockpepper Bay is a bay 3.5 nautical miles (6 km) wide at its entrance, lying east of Boreal Point along the north coast of Joinville Island. Surveyed by the Falkland Islands Dependencies Survey (FIDS) in 1953–54. So named by the United Kingdom Antarctic Place-Names Committee (UK-APC) because of the very many small islands and rocks in the bay.

References

Bays of Graham Land
Landforms of the Joinville Island group